Bobby Moranda is an American baseball coach and former outfielder. He played college baseball for the Eastern Kentucky Colonels from 1985 to 1986. He then served as the head coach of the Western Carolina Catamounts (2008–2022).

Playing career
Moranda first enrolled at Harper College. In 1984, he accepted a scholarship to play for the Eastern Kentucky Colonels baseball team. In two seasons, he batted .307 with 20 home runs and 86 RBI.

Coaching career
In 1987, Moranda began his coaching career as an assistant at Eastern Kentucky. In 1989, Moranda accepted a position as an assistant with the Virginia Cavaliers baseball program. Moranda then joined the coaching staff at Wake Forest in 1995. In 2001, he joined the coaching staff of the Georgia Tech Yellow Jackets baseball team.

On July 19, 2007, Moranda was named the head coach of the Western Carolina Catamounts baseball program.

Head coaching record

References

External links
Bobby Moranda 2020 Western Carolina Catamounts bio

Living people
Baseball outfielders
Harper Hawks baseball players
Eastern Kentucky Colonels baseball players
Eastern Kentucky Colonels baseball coaches
Virginia Cavaliers baseball coaches
Wake Forest Demon Deacons baseball coaches
Georgia Tech Yellow Jackets baseball coaches
Western Carolina Catamounts baseball coaches
Year of birth missing (living people)
People from Palatine, Illinois
Baseball coaches from Illinois